Winterschmidtiidae is a family of mites in the order Astigmata.

Genera
These twenty-eight genera belong to the family Winterschmidtiidae:

 Acalvolia Fain, 1971
 Allocalvolia Fain & Rack, 1987
 Calvolia Oudemans, 1911
 Congovidia Fain & Elsen, in Fain, 1971
 Crabrovidia Zakhvatkin, 1941
 Czenspinskia Oudemans, 1927
 Ensliniella Vitzthum, 1925
 Gambacarus Mahunka, 1975
 Kennethiella Cooreman, 1954
 Kurosaia Okabe & OConnor, 2002
 Macroharpa Mostafa, 1970
 Monobiacarus Baker & Cunliffe, 1960
 Neocalvolia Hughes, 1970
 Neosuidasia Ranganath & Channabasa, 1983
 Neottiglyphus Volgin, 1974
 Oulenzia Radford, 1950
 Oulenziella Fan et al., 2015
 Parawinterschmidtia Khaustov, 2000
 Procalvolia Fain, 1971
 Riemia Oudemans, 1925
 Saproglyphus Berlese, 1890
 Sphexicozela Mahunka, 1970
 Trypetacarus Fain, 1971
 Vespacarus Baker, 1960
 Vidia Oudemans, 1905
 Winterschmidtia Oudemans, 1923
 Zethacarus Mostafa, 1971
 Zethovidia Mostafa, 1970

References

Further reading

External links

 

Acari
Acari families